Ibn Battuta is a rapid transit station on the Red Line of the Dubai Metro in Dubai, UAE, serving Jebel Ali and surrounding areas. The station is named after the nearby Ibn Battuta Mall.

The station opened as part of the Red Line on 30 April 2010.

Ibn Battuta station is located on the Sheikh Zayed Road between major junctions with the D59 and D591 roads. Nearby are the Ibn Battuta Mall, the Jebel Ali Recreation Club, and the IBN Battuta Bus Station immediately adjacent to the station. Surrounding neighbourhoods include The Gardens and Jabal Ali 2. The station is close to a number of bus routes.

During January 2018 to April 2019, the Red Line between the DMCC and Ibn Battuta stations was closed for an extension to the Dubai Metro system.

See also
 Ibn Battuta (1304–1368/1369), a Muslim Moroccan scholar and explorer

References

External links

 Ibn Battuta Metro Station Dubai on YouTube

Railway stations in the United Arab Emirates opened in 2010
Dubai Metro stations